Samuel de Champlain Provincial Park is a provincial park in Ontario, Canada.

The park spans both sides of the Mattawa River. It is administered by Ontario Parks, which classifies it as a natural environment park.

This park is popular in the summer with campers, providing many recreational activities such as canoeing, swimming, hiking, wildlife viewing, and other family activities. The visitors centre houses the Voyageur Heritage Centre, which highlights the historic importance of the Mattawa River to the fur trade through interactive exhibits. The park is also home to the Canadian Ecology Centre, an outdoor education centre, which provides educational programs on sustainable forestry.

The park is named after Samuel de Champlain, one of the first French explorers of Canada of the 17th century.

External links

Provincial parks of Ontario
Parks in Nipissing District
Protected areas established in 1990
1990 establishments in Ontario